The Birmingham Street Commissioners were a local government body, created in Birmingham, England in 1769, with powers to manage matters such as streets, markets, and policing. Subsequent Improvement Acts of 1773, 1801, and 1812 gave increased powers to the Street Commissioners. They lasted until they were wound up in 1852, and replaced by Birmingham Town Council.

The street commissioners (elsewhere also called improvement commissioners or pavement commissioners) were given the power to ensure clean streets and to provide lighting by oil lamps. Roads could also be widened by the demolition of buildings and removal of cellar entrances.

Background
Unlike many large towns, Birmingham was not incorporated as a borough with a municipal corporation, and so until 1769, the only institutions of local government were the parish vestry and manoral institutions such as the court leet. By the mid-18th century, it was clear that these institutions were inadequate for the needs of the growing town, and that a new local government body was needed. The most acceptable proposal, first made in 1765, was for a dedicated body of commissioners to levy a rate to carry out certain precisely defined functions, such as ensuring the efficient working of the markets, and the provision of street lighting. An Act of Parliament to create this body was passed in 1769, with the passage of the Birmingham Improvement Act 1769.

The powers of the Street Commissioners were gradually increased by further Acts of Parliament, which were obtained in 1773, 1801, 1812 and 1828.

Members and meetings

The Board of Street Commissioners originally consisted of fifty residents, unpaid, each of whom owned property with a rateable value of over fifteen pounds. They initially included Sampson Lloyd (banker), John Taylor (banking partner of Sampson Lloyd), Dr. John Ash (founder of the General Hospital), solicitor and benefactor George Barker, and John Baskerville (printer). The number of Commissioners was steadily increased, with another 42 being appointed in 1801, 99 in 1812, and 88 in 1828.

They were a self-perpetuating body, when members died or resigned they chose replacements themselves. At first, they met in whatever room was available, but the 1801 Act allowed them to build a dedicated Public Office in Moor Street, designed by William Hollins, which was shared with the magistrates. This was completed in 1807, and enlarged in 1828.

Activities

Roads
The Street Commissioners were responsible for keeping the roads and streets clean and free from obstructions, in this vein they were given powers to acquire and demolish buildings in order to widen the streets, and make way for public buildings and markets. From 1812 they also became responsible for the repair of the road surfaces.

The 1773 Act gave powers for the widening of Moor Street, Smallbrook Street, New Street and parts of Colmore Row (previously called Ann Street).

Lighting
The Commissioners provided street lighting, either directly or by putting the work out to contractors. Originally oil lamps were used, but from 1818, gas lighting was introduced.

Markets

One of their early targets was the control and reorganisation of the markets, concentrating them into the area now known as the Bull Ring. This was a result of new markets being established across the town in scattered locations, often in narrow streets, which created severe congestion. The Commissioners set about creating a large central marketplace at the Bull Ring by gradually acquiring and clearing buildings from the area, and by 1810 this was largely complete. In 1817, the Smithfield Market was created on the moat of the old manor house. This handled cattle, horses, sheep, pigs, hay and straw.

In 1824, they purchased the Manor and rights to the markets from the lord of the manor.

Under powers granted by The Improvement Act of 1828 (9 Geo. IV), the Market Hall was opened in 1835 for general merchandise. It was gutted by incendiary bombs in the Birmingham Blitz, during World War II and the remaining walls demolished in 1963.

Policing
The 1773 Act empowered the commissioners to appoint night-watchmen, but they had insufficient funds to do so until 1801, however they supervised a privately paid watch from 1783. By daytime, until 1812 the only police force were the parish constables. The Act of 1812 empowered the commissioners to appoint constables for both day and night, and by 1839 they were employing about 30 day police and 180 night-watchmen. In 1839 an Act of Parliament was passed in response to a riot, creating the Birmingham Town Police, and the existing police force of the street commissioners was disbanded.

Public buildings

The 1801 Act gave the Street Commissioners authority to carry out public works, and construct public buildings, a right which was further expanded in the 1828 Act. Among the major buildings they commissioned were the aforementioned Public Office on Moor Street, and Market Hall, both now demolished.

Perhaps the most significant lasting legacy of the Street Commissioners is the Birmingham Town Hall, which they commissioned, and which was built between 1832 and 1834 in order to house music festivals.

Demise
The Municipal Corporations Act 1835 led to Birmingham being incorporated as a municipal borough in 1838, with an elected council; Birmingham Town Council. At first, this had no effect on the Street Commissioners, who carried on as before, as the new council initially only had limited powers. The council aspired however to take over the powers of the Street Commissioners, as it was viewed as desirable to have all local government carried out by a single body, especially as the council was elected, whereas the Commissioners were a self-selecting body and therefore unrepresentative.

The Street Commissioners were wound up by the Birmingham Improvement Act of 1851, which gave the Town Council all of their powers (together with their property and debts) this took effect from the beginning of 1852.

References

Localhistories.org - A Brief History Of Birmingham
'Economic and Social History: Markets and Fairs', A History of the County of Warwick: Volume 7: The City of Birmingham (1964), pp. 251-52.
The Real History of Birmingham, Volume 2, J. P. Lethbridge, Newgate Press, 2002, 
Birmingham Buildings, The Architectural Story of a Midland City, Bryan Little, 1971, 

History of Birmingham, West Midlands
Local government in Birmingham, West Midlands
Improvement commissioners